Xincheng Xie is a professor of physics and Dean, School of Physics, Peking University.

He was awarded the status of Fellow in the American Physical Society, after he was nominated by his Forum on International Physics in 2008, for important contributions to the theoretical understanding of two-dimensional electron systems. He worked to foster collaboration between physicists in China and the United States, and co-organizing a number of important international workshops and conferences.

References 

Fellows of the American Physical Society
American Physical Society
Physicists from Jiangsu
Living people
Date of death missing
Year of birth missing (living people)
Academic staff of Peking University
Educators from Nanjing
Scientists from Nanjing